Martina Suchá was the defending champion but lost to Alicia Molik in the first round.

Molik went on to win the tournament, beating Amy Frazier 6-2, 4-6, 6-4, in the final.

Seeds

  Katarina Srebotnik (second round)
  Amy Frazier (final)
  Barbara Schett (second round)
  Elena Likhovtseva (semifinals)
  Vera Zvonareva (quarterfinals)
  Rita Grande (first round)
  Cara Black (second round)
  Jill Craybas (quarterfinals)

Draw

Finals

Top half

Bottom half

Qualifying

Seeds

Qualifiers

Qualifying draw

First qualifier

Second qualifier

Third qualifier

Fourth qualifier

References
Draw

2003 Moorilla Hobart International